Tent Rock is a small nunatak shaped like a ridge tent, lying 1 nautical mile (1.9 km) southwest of Thomas Rock and 7 nautical miles (13 km) west of Ricker Hills in the Prince Albert Mountains, Oates Land. Mapped and descriptively named by the Southern Party of New Zealand Geological Survey Antarctic Expedition (NZGSAE) (1962–63).

Nunataks of Oates Land